Punganur dwarf cattle which originated from the Chitoor District of Andhra Pradesh in southern India is among the world's smallest humped cattle breeds. The Punganur breed's milk has a high fat content. While cow milk normally has a fat content of 3 to 3.5 per cent, the Punganur breed's milk contains 8 per cent.

Description
The breed is named after the town of its origin, Punganur, in Chittoor district situated in the south-eastern tip of the Deccan Plateau. Animals are white and light grey in colour with a broad forehead and short horns. Its average height is 70–90 cm and its weight is 115–200 kg. The cow has an average milk yield of 3 to 5 litres/day and has a daily feed intake of 5 kg. It is highly drought resistant, and able to survive exclusively on dry fodder.

Some of the breed characteristics are:
 Back sloping downwards from front to hind quarters.
 Tail touching the ground.
 Slight mobile horns, almost flat along the back and normally at different heights from each other.

Nearly Extinct
The Punganur is on the verge of extinction, with some 500 to 600 animals as per Govt Doctors  odd animals remaining. This decline is mainly due to the Indian Government's 2013 objective of 'bettering' Indian cattle breeds with Holstein-Friesian and Jersey cattle traits from developed countries, and banning the rearing of native bull breeds. The remaining Punganur cattle are being reared mainly on the Livestock Research Station, Palamaner, Chittoor district, attached to SV Veterinary University. A small informal group of private breeders are also working on reviving the breed.

It is not officially recognised as a breed since there are only a few animals remaining.

References

Cattle breeds originating in India
Cattle breeds
Animal husbandry in Andhra Pradesh